Lignosus dimiticus is a species of poroid fungus in the family Polyporaceae that is found in Zaire. Unlike other members of Lignosus, L. dimiticus has a dimitic hyphal system, as it lacks binding hyphae in its trama and context.

References

Polyporaceae
Fungi described in 1975
Fungi of Africa
Taxa named by Leif Ryvarden